Vladan Giljen (born 7 December 1989) is a Montenegrin footballer who plays as a goalkeeper for Montenegrin club Sutjeska Nikšić.

Club career 
Vladan Giljen, born in Nikšić, is the son of Pero Giljen who was a goalkeeper of FK Sutjeska Nikšić, where Vladan also started his career.  After playing 3 seasons with Sutjeska in the Montenegrin First League he moved to Portugal and signed with top league side C.D. Nacional in summer 2010.  He made his Liga Sagres debut for C.D. Nacional on February 2, 2012, in a 2–0 win against Paços de Ferreira.  After playing 3 seasons with Nacional, he joined Serbian side OFK Beograd in summer 2013.

International career
Vladan Giljen played for the Montenegrin U19 and U21 teams.

References 

1989 births
Living people
Footballers from Nikšić
Association football goalkeepers
Montenegrin footballers
Montenegro youth international footballers
Montenegro under-21 international footballers
FK Sutjeska Nikšić players
C.D. Nacional players
OFK Beograd players
FK Čelik Nikšić players
KF Tërbuni Pukë players
KS Kastrioti players
Montenegrin First League players
Primeira Liga players
Serbian SuperLiga players
Kategoria Superiore players
Montenegrin expatriate footballers
Montenegrin expatriate sportspeople in Portugal
Expatriate footballers in Portugal
Montenegrin expatriate sportspeople in Serbia
Expatriate footballers in Serbia
Montenegrin expatriate sportspeople in Albania
Expatriate footballers in Albania